"Answering the Question: What Is Enlightenment?", often referred to simply as "What Is Enlightenment?", is a 1784 essay by the philosopher Immanuel Kant. In the December 1784 publication of the Berlinische Monatsschrift (Berlin Monthly), edited by Friedrich Gedike and Johann Erich Biester, Kant replied to the question posed a year earlier by the Reverend Johann Friedrich Zöllner, who was also an official in the Prussian government. Zöllner's question was addressed to a broad intellectual public community, in reply to Biester's essay entitled: "Proposal, not to engage the clergy any longer when marriages are conducted" (April 1783) and a number of leading intellectuals replied with essays, of which Kant's is the most famous and has had the most impact. Kant's opening paragraph of the essay is a much-cited definition of a lack of enlightenment as people's inability to think for themselves due not to their lack of intellect, but lack of courage.

Kant's essay also addressed the causes of a lack of enlightenment and the preconditions necessary to make it possible for people to enlighten themselves. He held it necessary that all church and state paternalism be abolished and people be given the freedom to use their own intellect. Kant praised Frederick II of Prussia for creating these preconditions. Kant focused on religious issues, saying that "our rulers" had less interest in telling citizens what to think in regard to artistic and scientific issues.

Basic understanding 
Kant answers the question in the first sentence of the essay: "Enlightenment is man's emergence from his self-incurred immaturity (Unmündigkeit)."  He argues that the immaturity is self-inflicted not from a lack of understanding, but from the lack of courage to use one's reason, intellect, and wisdom without the guidance of another.  Kant argued that using one's reason is considered dangerous by most men and all women.  He exclaims that the motto of the Enlightenment is "Sapere aude"! – Dare to be wise!

In the sense used here, the German word "Unmündigkeit" does not mean having attained age of majority or legal adulthood. Literally translated, "Unmündig" is non-mouthed or not having a voice to raise. "Unmündig" also means "dependent" or "unfree", and another translation is "tutelage" or "nonage" (the condition of "not [being] of age").  Kant, whose moral philosophy is centred on the concept of autonomy, distinguishes between a person who is intellectually autonomous and one who keeps him/herself in an intellectually heteronomous, i.e., dependent and immature state.

Kant understands the majority of people to be content to follow the guiding institutions of society, such as the Church and the Monarchy, and unable to throw off the yoke of their immaturity due to a lack of resolution to be autonomous. It is difficult for individuals to work their way out of this immature, cowardly life because we are so uncomfortable with the idea of thinking for ourselves. Kant says that even if we did throw off the spoon-fed dogma and formulas we have absorbed, we would still be stuck, because we have never "cultivated our minds".

The key to throwing off these chains of mental immaturity is reason. There is hope that the entire public could become a force of free thinking individuals if they are free to do so. Why? There will always be a few people, even among the institutional "guardians", who think for themselves. They will help the rest of us to "cultivate our minds". Kant shows himself a man of his times when he observes that "a revolution may well put an end to autocratic despotism ... or power-seeking oppression, but it will never produce a true reform in ways of thinking". The recently completed American Revolution had made a great impression in Europe; Kant cautions that new prejudice will replace the old and become a new leash to control the "great unthinking masses".

Private and public use of reasoning 
Private use of reason is doing something because we have to. For example, rational workers in a specific occupation use private reasoning to complete tasks.

Public use of reason is doing something in the public sphere because we choose to improve our private function.  Although someone may find his job or function disagreeable, the task must be completed for society to flow consistently.  He may, however, use public reasoning in order to complain about the function in the public sphere. In this essay Kant argues that the role of the state and church must be such that it allows the individual to practice their public reason. Only when the individual is allowed to practice his public reason will society as a whole progress towards enlightenment.

A military officer is required to obey the orders of his superiors. A clergyman is required to teach the doctrines of the church that employs him. But the responsibilities of their office do not preclude them from publicly voicing any opinions that may conflict with those responsibilities. We expect office holders to stay in character at all times, but Kant gives examples. A clergyman is not free to make use of his reason in the execution of his duties, but as "a scholar addressing the real public through his writings, the clergyman making public use of his reason enjoys unlimited freedom to use his own reason and to speak in his own person".

Kant and religion 
Staying on the religious theme, Kant asks whether a religious synod or presbytery should be entitled to "commit itself by oath to a certain unalterable set of doctrines". He answers that a contract like this prevents "all further enlightenment of mankind forever". It is impossible and immoral that the people of one generation could restrict the thoughts of the next generation, to prevent the extension and correction of previous knowledge, and stop all future progress. Based on this, later generations are not bound by the oaths of preceding generations. With freedom, each citizen, especially the clergy, could provide public comment until public insight and public opinion changes the religious institution. But Kant says that it is impossible to agree, "even for a single lifetime", to a permanent religious constitution that doesn't allow public comment and criticism. If one were to renounce enlightenment for later generations, one would be trampling on the "sacred rights of mankind". Neither an individual citizen nor a monarch has the right to constrict historical development.

Kant further explains why he has been emphasizing the religious aspect: religious immaturity, "is the most pernicious and dishonourable variety of all". If Enlightenment is man's emergence from his 'self-incurred immaturity' and the guiding forces of society, then simply put: the church is a political force which constrains public behaviour through the use of doctrine. By defining doctrines and making them politically binding, the Church can control the growth of reason, therefore, publicly it is in your own self-interest not to assent to a set of beliefs that hinder the development of your reason. It is in man's interest to surpass those that prevent him from using his own reason.

Kant and Frederick the Great 
Then Kant segues to the subject of his monarch, Frederick the Great. He states that a monarch should allow his subjects to do or think whatever they find necessary for their salvation, and that such thoughts and deeds are "none of his business". Religious ideas should not be subject to government oversight, and government should not support "spiritual despotism" against any of his subjects.

It is insisted that the king favours freedom in the arts and sciences because there is "no danger to his legislation" from his subjects' making public use of their own reason and providing "forthright criticism of the current legislation". Throughout history we see that most monarchs do perceive danger from free thinking subjects.

Kant asks if they (those living in 1784) are living in an "enlightened age". The answer is no, but they do live in an "age of enlightenment". His point here is that because of the actions of Frederick, there are fewer obstacles to "universal enlightenment". Religious leaders may "freely and publicly submit to the judgment of the world their verdicts and opinions, even if these deviate ... from orthodox doctrine".

Finally, Kant provides some philosophy that is probably directed towards his monarch by proposing a paradox. "A high degree of civil freedom seems advantageous to a people's intellectual freedom, yet it also sets up insuperable barriers to it. Conversely, a lesser degree of civil freedom gives intellectual freedom enough room to expand to its fullest extent."

Kant and orientation in thinking 
Orientation in thinking links very much with direction of thought: on what basis does our thought path determine the way we act?

This is split into two conceptions, theoretical and practical thinking. Theoretical thinking is the laws of thought. It is subjective (an assumption), but must be established to prevent us from falling into chaos. A key example of this is the idea of an intelligible first cause and development of our moral attitudes. Practical thinking is the application of theoretical thinking to our thoughts, with which we can ensure the basis of moral laws through the concepts of freedom, highest good and happiness.

Kant and historical development 
Humanity as a species requires historical development to become autonomous, for reason does not work instinctively; it requires trial, practice and instruction to allow it to progress. 'Argue as much as you like, but obey' as, through opposition, a synthesis can develop. Resistance is needed for development.

Foucault and "What is Enlightenment?" 
In 1984 French philosopher Michel Foucault published an essay on Kant's work, giving it the same title. Foucault's essay reflected on the contemporary status of the project of enlightenment, inverting much of Kant's reasoning but concluding that enlightenment still "requires work on our limits".

See also
 Age of Enlightenment
 Anti-intellectualism
 Golden Age of Freethought
 Higher criticism
 Natural philosophy
 Public reason
 Self-efficacy

References

Further reading
  English translation and commentary.

External links

 Answer To The Question, What Is Enlightenment? 1798 translation (Essays and Treatises on Moral, Political, and various Philosophical Subjects by Kant, Immanuel, 1724-1804) 
 An English translation of Kant's essay
 A dual-language interactive version 

Philosophy essays
Age of Enlightenment
1784 essays
Essays by Immanuel Kant
Books about historiography
Enlightenment philosophy
Scientific revolution
Works originally published in German magazines
German essays